The New Jersey Devils are an American professional ice hockey team based in Newark, New Jersey. They are members of the Metropolitan Division of the Eastern Conference in the National Hockey League (NHL). The Devils entered the League as the Kansas City Scouts in 1974. After just two years in Kansas City, they moved to Denver, Colorado, where they were known as the Colorado Rockies. In 1982, the team moved again to New Jersey. They currently play their home games at the Prudential Center.

The franchise and its members have won numerous team and individual awards and honors. They have captured the Prince of Wales Trophy as the Eastern Conference playoff champion five times, while they have also won Stanley Cup three times, in 1995, 2000 and 2003. Former goaltender Martin Brodeur is the team's most decorated player, having won the Vezina Trophy four times and the William M. Jennings Trophy five times, and the Calder Memorial Trophy once, along with several selections to the NHL First and second All-Star teams. Scott Stevens played in ten NHL All-Star Games, more than any player in team history. Taylor Hall is the only player in franchise history to have won the Hart Memorial Trophy.

Five players have had their numbers retired by the team. Patrik Elias the most recent, having his no. 26 retired on February 24, 2018. Brodeur's no. 30 in 2016, Stevens' no. 4 and Ken Daneyko's no. 3 were removed from circulation in 2006, while Scott Niedermayer's no. 27 was retired in 2011. Stevens, Niedermayer and Brodeur are some of several Hockey Hall of Famers who were associated with the Devils. Joe Nieuwendyk, Brendan Shanahan, Doug Gilmour, Dave Andreychuk, Peter Stastny, Viacheslav Fetisov and Igor Larionov each spent time in New Jersey during their Hall of Fame careers, while head coach Herb Brooks and general manager Lou Lamoriello have been inducted as builders. Longtime broadcaster Mike Emrick was enshrined in 2009 as a "Media honoree."

The Devils have four internal team awards. The Three-Star Award is awarded to the player who earns the most three-star selections throughout the season, while the Hugh Delano Unsung Hero, the Devils' Players' Player, and the Most Valuable Devil awards are presented towards the end of each season.

League awards

Team trophies
The Devils have won the Eastern (previously the Wales) Conference five times in franchise history, and have won the Stanley Cup three times, most recently in 2003.

Individual awards
Martin Brodeur is the Devils' most decorated player.  He has won the Vezina Trophy four times and the Jennings Trophy five times.  He has also won the Calder Memorial Trophy as the NHL rookie of the year, and has made the First or second All-Star team seven times.

Former Devils' captain Scott Stevens earned several honors during his tenure with the team.  He was named to four All-Star teams, and led the league in plus-minus during the 1993–94 season.  Scott Niedermayer won the James Norris Memorial Trophy as the league's best defenseman in 2004, and was a member of three All-Star teams, including the NHL All-Rookie Team.

All-Stars

NHL first and second team All-Stars
The NHL first and second team All-Stars are the top players at each position as voted on by the Professional Hockey Writers' Association.

NHL All-Rookie Team
The NHL All-Rookie Team consists of the top rookies at each position as voted on by the Professional Hockey Writers' Association.

All-Star Game selections
The National Hockey League All-Star Game is a mid-season exhibition game held annually between many of the top players of each season. Thirty All-Star Games have been held since the Devils arrived in New Jersey, with at least one player representing the Devils in each year.  In total, 21 players have been selected to represent the Devils during the competition. The All-Star game has not been held in various years: 1979 and 1987 due to the 1979 Challenge Cup and Rendez-vous '87 series between the NHL and the Soviet national team, respectively, 1995, 2005, and 2013 as a result of labor stoppages, 2006, 2010, and 2014 because of the Winter Olympic Games, and 2021 as a result of the COVID-19 pandemic.

The Devils hosted the 1984 All-Star Game at the Meadowlands Arena. The Wales Conference defeated the Campbell Conference 7–6; Devils goaltender Glenn Resch got the win for the Wales, while defenseman Joe Cirella added a goal and an assist. Scott Stevens was named to 11 All-Star games, and played in ten, both team records.  Devils coaches Jacques Lemaire, Robbie Ftorek and Larry Robinson have all served as coaches for All-Star teams.

During All-Star Weekend, the NHL also holds a YoungStars Game for first- and second-year players.  The Devils have sent three players: Paul Martin, Zach Parise and David Clarkson. Two others, Adam Henrique and Adam Larsson, were selected in 2012 but did not attend due to injuries. Parise was the MVP of the 2007 game, after scoring two goals and four assists.  Defenseman Scott Niedermayer has also won the Fastest Skater event during the SuperSkills Competition twice, in 1998 and 2004.

 Selected by fan vote

All-Star Game replacement events

Career achievements

Hockey Hall of Fame

Several members of the Devils organization have been honored by the Hockey Hall of Fame during the team's history in New Jersey.  Peter Stastny was the first former Devils to be inducted, gaining election in 1998.  Stastny played part of four seasons with the Devils, scoring 173 points in 217 games. Former teammate Viacheslav Fetisov joined him in 2001; the Russian defenseman played six years in New Jersey, and was an assistant coach from 1999 to 2002. Scott Stevens, the team captain for 13 years, was inducted in 2007, the first Hall member to earn his credentials primarily as a member of the Devils.  In 2008, Igor Larionov was inducted into the Hall; he played his final season with the Devils in the 2003–04 NHL season. Devils coaches Jacques Lemaire (inducted 1984) and Larry Robinson (inducted 1995) were inducted as players prior to their involvement with the Devils organization.

In addition to players, two members of team management have been inducted in the "Builders" category.  Former coach Herb Brooks, the man behind the United States' improbable "Miracle on Ice" victory in the 1980 Winter Olympics, was inducted in 2006.  Brooks coached the Devils during the 1992–93 campaign.  Three years later, longtime general manager Lou Lamoriello was inducted.  Lamoriello, the team's third GM, has been with the team since 1987, and is considered responsible for engineering the franchise's success.

Foster Hewitt Memorial Award
The Foster Hewitt Memorial Award is presented by the Hockey Hall of Fame to members of the radio and television industry who make outstanding contributions to their profession and the game of ice hockey during their broadcasting career. In 2008, longtime Devils television broadcaster Mike "Doc" Emrick was honored with the award for his years of play-by-play broadcasting for the Devils and various other networks and teams.  In addition to the Devils, Emrick is the regular play-by-play announcer for the NHL on NBC, and has covered multiple Olympic broadcasts.

Lester Patrick Trophy
Eight members of the Devils organization have been honored with the Lester Patrick Trophy. The trophy has been presented by the National Hockey League and USA Hockey since 1966 to honor a recipient's contribution to ice hockey in the United States. This list includes all personnel who have ever been employed by the New Jersey Devils in any capacity and have also received the Lester Patrick Trophy.

United States Hockey Hall of Fame

Retired numbers

The Devils have retired five numbers. The Devils retired no. 4 for defenseman Scott Stevens in February 2006. Stevens was the team's captain for 13 seasons, and won the Conn Smythe Trophy as the most valuable player of the playoffs during the team's Stanley Cup victory in 2000. The following month, the team retired no. 3 in honor of longtime defenseman Ken Daneyko. Daneyko was drafted by the Devils in 1982, and spent his entire career with the team, retiring as the franchise's all-time leader in games played. On December 16, 2011, the Devils raised Scott Niedermayer's no. 27 to the rafters. Niedermayer won three Stanley Cups with New Jersey (1995, 2000 and 2003) and served as captain during Scott Stevens' absence in 2004. On February 9, 2016, the Devils raised Martin Brodeur's no. 30 to the rafters. On February 24, 2018, the Devils retired Patrik Elias' no. 26 jersey, who spent his entire career with the Devils and retired holding several team's records. Also out of circulation is the number 99 which was retired league-wide for Wayne Gretzky on February 6, 2000. Gretzky did not play for the Devils during his 20-year NHL career and no Devils player had ever worn the number 99 prior to its retirement.

Team awards

Three-Star Award
The Devils award the Three-Star Award to the player who is named one of a game's top three players, or "three stars", most often over the course of the regular season. Martin Brodeur has won the award eleven times, the most in team history.

Defunct team awards

Devils' Players' Player

The Devils' Players' Player was a team award voted on by the players. Jay Pandolfo and Scott Stevens have each won this award three times, the most of any Devil.

Hugh Delano Unsung Hero

The Hugh Delano Unsung Hero was a Devils team award given each year and voted on by the players; it was named after Hugh Delano, who was a longtime writer who covered the Devils for the New York Post.  Defenseman Bryce Salvador and goaltender Johan Hedberg shared the award in 2011–12. There was a humorous mix-up at the awards dinner when rookie Adam Henrique was mistakenly announced as the winner.  Jay Pandolfo won the award five times, more than any other player.

Most Valuable Devil
The Most Valuable Devil was, as the name implies, the player judged most valuable to the team by his teammates.  Zach Parise won his second consecutive award in 2010, after becoming the first player in franchise history to score 30 goals in four consecutive seasons.  Martin Brodeur won this award ten times, more than any other player.

Other awards

Notes

References

New Jersey Devils
award
award winners

ru:Список наград Филадельфии Флайерз